Aoife Ní Fhearraigh, or simply Aoife, is an Irish singer. A well-known interpreter of Irish Gaelic songs, she released her first recording in 1991 and worked with Moya Brennan to produce her much acclaimed 1996 album Aoife. She reached international recognition in 1998 when her song "The Best is Yet to Come" was used for the Metal Gear Solid soundtrack. To date, Aoife has worked closely with artists such as Phil Coulter, Roma Downey and Brian Kennedy, and she has also toured the US, Japan and Europe.

Discography
Loinneog Cheoil (1991, with Dervish)
Aoife (1996)
The Turning of the Tide (2003)
Loinneog Cheoil (2005, re-recorded)
If I Told You (2006)

See also
 Music of Ireland
 List of traditional Irish singers

References

External links

Year of birth missing (living people)
20th-century Irish women singers
Living people
Irish folk singers
Irish-language singers
New-age musicians
Musicians from County Donegal
People from Gweedore
21st-century Irish women singers